The Cornhill Magazine (1860–1975) was a monthly Victorian magazine and literary journal named after the street address of the founding publisher Smith, Elder & Co. at 65 Cornhill in London. In the 1860s, under the editorship of William Makepeace Thackeray, the paper's large circulation peaked around 110,000. Due to emerging competitors, circulation fell to 20,000 by 1870. The following year, Leslie Stephen took over as editor. When Stephen left in 1882, circulation had further fallen to 12,000. The Cornhill was purchased by John Murray in 1912, and continued to publish issues until 1975.

History
The Cornhill was founded by George Murray Smith in 1859, and the first issue displayed the cover date January 1860. A literary journal with articles on diverse subjects and serialisations of new novels, it continued until 1975. Smith had hoped to gain some of the readership enjoyed by All the Year Round, a similar magazine owned by Charles Dickens; toward this end, he employed as editor William Thackeray, Dickens's great literary rival at the time. Subsequent editors included G. H. Lewes, Leslie Stephen, Ronald Gorell Barnes, James Payn, Peter Quennell and Leonard Huxley.

The magazine was initially successful, selling more issues than expected, but within a few years circulation dropped rapidly as it failed to keep pace with changes in popular taste. It also gained a reputation for rather safe, inoffensive content in the late Victorian era. A mark of the high regard in which it had been held was its publication of Leaves from the Journal of Our Life in the Highlands by Queen Victoria. Stories were often illustrated by pre-eminent artists of the time, including George du Maurier, Edwin Landseer, Frederic Leighton and John Everett Millais. 

From 1917 the magazine was published by John Murray of Albemarle Street, London.
Contributors to The Cornhill in the 1930s and 1940s included Elizabeth Bowen, Rose Macaulay, Mary Webb, D. K. Broster and Nugent Barker.

Notable works published
Important works serialised in the magazine include the following:

Framley Parsonage by Anthony Trollope
Wives and Daughters by Elizabeth Gaskell
The White Company and J. Habakuk Jephson's Statement by Arthur Conan Doyle
Tithonus by Alfred Tennyson
Washington Square by Henry James
Culture and Anarchy by Matthew Arnold
Romola by George Eliot
"The Lagoon" by Joseph Conrad
Far from the Madding Crowd by Thomas Hardy
Unto This Last by John Ruskin
Armadale by Wilkie Collins
Emma (Posthumous Fragment) by Charlotte Brontë
Daisy Miller by Henry James

Archives 
A list of issues of the magazine available for viewing online is provided by John Mark Ockerbloom through a webserver of the University of Pennsylvania: https://onlinebooks.library.upenn.edu/webbin/serial?id=cornhill

References

Further reading 

 The Cornhill Magazine. v.5 (1862);   v.8 (1863);  v.11 (1865);  v.19 (1869);  v.25 (1872);  v.35 (1877).
 Cooke, Simon. Illustrated Periodicals of the 1860s. Pinner, Middlesex: Private Libraries Association, 2010 .

External links

1859 establishments in the United Kingdom
1975 disestablishments in the United Kingdom
Monthly magazines published in the United Kingdom
Defunct literary magazines published in the United Kingdom
Magazines established in 1859
Magazines disestablished in 1975
Smith, Elder & Co books